Humanitarian is a 1999 album by Jimmy Cliff.

Track listing
All tracks composed by Jimmy Cliff; except where indicated

"Humanitarian" – 4:17
"Rise Up" – 3:54
"Giants" 4:43
"Come up to My Love" 3:58
"How Long" 3:59
"Let's Jam" 4:37
"Keep the Family" 4:07
"Drifters" 4:14
"The Hill" 4:59
"I Walk With Love" 4:12
"I'm in All" 3:49
"Humanitarian" [Slow] 4:07
"Ob-La-Di, Ob-La-Da" [*] – 3:04 (John Lennon, Paul McCartney)
"You've Got a Friend" [*] – 5:04 (Carole King)

Personnel
Jimmy Cliff - lead guitar, acoustic guitar, percussion, keyboards, backing vocals
Wayne Armond — guitar, backing vocals
Aston Barrett — bass
Noel "Bunny" Brown — backing vocals
Cleveland "Clevie" Browne — drums
Dalton Browne — guitar
Danny Browne — bass
Junior "Chico" Chin — horn
Ansel Collins — keyboards
Cat Coore — guitar
Tyrone Downie — harmonica, keyboards
Sly Dunbar — drums
Jennifer Edwards — backing vocals
Michael Fletcher — bass
Sharon Forrester — backing vocals
Dean Fraser — horn, saxophone
Brian Gold — backing vocals
Tony Gold — backing vocals
Marcia Griffiths — backing vocals
Paul Hall — background vocals
Prilly Hamilton — background vocals
Clive "Azul" Hunt — keyboards
Daniel Lanois — mandolin
J.C. Lodge — backing vocals
Robert Lyn	— keyboards
Rita Marley — backing vocals
Judy Mowatt — backing vocals
Benjy Myaz — bass
Benjamin Myers — bass
Ronald "Nambo" Robinson — horn
Stan Ryck — backing vocals
Robbie Shakespeare — bass
Chris "Sky Juice" Blake — percussion
Handel Tucker — keyboards
Michael Wallace — keyboards, backing vocals
Franklyn Waul — keyboards
Lloyd "Gitsy" Willis — guitar, mandolin

1999 albums
Jimmy Cliff albums
Albums produced by Daniel Lanois